Lucas Pellegrini (born 17 April 2000) is a French professional footballer who plays as a midfielder for  club Nancy.

Club career
Born in Ajaccio, Corsica, he played for AC Ajaccio's reserve team in Championnat National 3 before being called up for the first team's Ligue 2 opener on 27 July 2018. He made his debut in that match as a 61st-minute substitute for Manuel Cabit in a 1–0 home loss to Troyes AC. On 3 September 2019, he signed his first professional contract.

In August 2020, he was loaned to Le Puy Foot 43 Auvergne of the Championnat National 2. A year later, he was lent to FC Bastia-Borgo of the Championnat National.

In July 2022, Pellegrini returned to France and signed a two-year contract with Nancy.

References

2000 births
Sportspeople from Ajaccio
Footballers from Corsica
Living people
Association football midfielders
French footballers
AC Ajaccio players
Le Puy Foot 43 Auvergne players
FC Bastia-Borgo players
Union Titus Pétange players
AS Nancy Lorraine players
Ligue 2 players
Championnat National players
Championnat National 2 players
Championnat National 3 players
Luxembourg National Division players
French expatriate footballers
Expatriate footballers in Luxembourg
French expatriate sportspeople in Luxembourg